Mouthwash is a liquid which is swilled around the mouth.

It may also refer to:

 "Mouthwash" (song), a Kate Nash song

See also
 Mouthwashing (disambiguation)